Shulamith Hareven (pen name, Tal Yaeri; February 14, 1930 – November 25, 2003) was an Israeli author and essayist.

Biography
She was born as Shulamith Riftin to a Zionist family. Her father, Avraham was a lawyer. They immigrated to Mandate Palestine in 1940.

At 17, she joined the Haganah and became a combat medic in the 1948 Arab-Israeli War; serving in the Battle for Jerusalem. Later, she was assigned to help establish Israel Defense Forces Radio; beginning the station's broadcasts in 1950. During the War of Attrition and the Yom Kippur War, she served as a war correspondent.

In 1962, she published her first book, a collection of poems titled Predatory Jerusalem. Since then, she has written prose, translations, and plays. Her essays have been collected in four volumes. She also published a thriller under the pen name "Tal Yaeri". Her books have been translated into 21 languages.

She was the first woman inducted into the Academy of the Hebrew Language and was an activist for Peace Now. In 1995 the French weekly L'Express deemed her an Author of Peace and listed her among the 100 women "who move the world".

Hareven protected her privacy: "I have always thought that culture begins where they know how to separate personal matters from public matters," she wrote in Hebrew in the foreword to her last book, Many Days, an Autobiography. Their daughter is the writer Gail Hareven.

She is buried at Har HaMenuchot in Jerusalem. An archive of her materials may be found at Ben-Gurion University.

Works translated into English
 City of Many Days (novel, 1977)
 The Miracle Hater (novella, 1988)
 Prophet (novella, 1990)
 Twilight and Other Stories (1991)
 Thirst: The Desert Trilogy (1996)
 The Vocabulary of Peace (essays, 1995)

References
Much of the content of this article is from article שולמית הראבן (Shulamith Hareven) in the Hebrew-language Wikipedia. Retrieved November 30, 2005.
"Shulamith Hareven" at the Institute for Translation of Hebrew Literature. Retrieved 15 June 2020.
Jewish Women's Archive biography

1930 births
2003 deaths
Israeli women essayists
Israeli non-fiction writers
Jewish women writers
Polish emigrants to Mandatory Palestine
Israeli people of Polish-Jewish descent
Israeli women poets
20th-century Israeli poets
20th-century essayists
20th-century Israeli women writers
20th-century Israeli writers
21st-century Israeli women writers
21st-century Israeli writers
21st-century Israeli poets
Recipients of Prime Minister's Prize for Hebrew Literary Works
20th-century pseudonymous writers
Pseudonymous women writers